Dreams of Childhood is a spoken word album by American indie folk musician Mark Kozelek and Argentine actor Nicolás Pauls. Executive produced by Pauls, the album features eleven poems written by Argentine street kids, translated by Pauls, Federico Novik, Pablo Cubarle and Catalina Moran. Proceeds from the album will be donated to La Casa de la Cultura de la Calle, an Argentine non-profit organization for homeless children.

Track listing

References

2015 albums
Mark Kozelek albums
Spoken word albums by American artists
Caldo Verde Records albums
2010s spoken word albums